The Mukha Rebellion started in 1490 in Galicia, and was led by Petro Mukha. Its purpose was overthrowing Polish control of Galicia.

Mukha started the revolt in Pokuttia in the late 15th century, in 1490. The revolt quickly spread to neighboring territories, across nearly all southeastern Galicia. Mukha, supported by the Moldavian voivode Stephen the Great, marched to Lviv with an army of 10,000 people.

The rebel army was composed of both Ukrainian and Moldavian peasants from places like Bukovina. In the army there were also Orthodox petty gentry noblemen originally from Pokuttia, as well as burghers (mischany / mistychi).

The ten-thousand-man army led by Mukha conquered the fortified cities of Kolomyia, Sniatyn, and Halych, killing a considerable number of enemy noblemen and burghers as they went.

As the army was advancing to Lviv, it was blocked by a combined force of Polish Royal Army soldiers, a levée en masse of Galician magnates, and Prussian mercenaries. At the Battle of Rohatyn, near Rohatyn, present-day Ivano-Frankivsk Oblast, the army suffered a crushing defeat and most of the rebels were killed. However, Mukha survived, and fled back to Moldavia with the other survivors.

Mukha returned to Galicia in 1492, in an unsuccessful attempt to stir up another rebellion. He was captured in the area of Kolomyia, and reportedly died in a prison in Kraków.

References

Conflicts in Ukraine
Battles involving Poland
Battles involving Moldavia
Rebellions in Ukraine
15th-century conflicts